Adam Blackwood (1539–1613) was a Scottish author and apologist for Mary, Queen of Scots.

Early life
He was born in 1539 in Dunfermline, Scotland, to William Blackwood and Helen Reid. The great-nephew of Robert Reid, Bishop of Orkney (1541-1558), he helped with Adam’s education at the University of Paris. His parents had deceased.

Career
Adam was orphaned at a young age and his education was sponsored by his great uncle, Robert Reid, Bishop of Orkney. Blackwood went to the University of Paris and then on to Toulouse to study civil law, with the direct patronage of Mary, Queen of Scots then in the French Court. In 1567-8 he was a rector of the University of Paris. Blackwood became a practicing lawyer in the Parlement at Poitiers, an appointment in the gift of Mary, awarded in 1579 after the publication of his first polemic, the De Conjunctione Religionis et Imperii. According to his Histoire (1589), Blackwood visited Mary in England.

Published works
Blackwood's major work was a critique of George Buchanan's dialogue De Iure Regni apud Scotos, (1579), in which Buchanan had intended to justify to the forced abdication of Mary, Queen of Scots.
 , Paris (1575), (Two books on the union of Religion and temporal power)
 The Apology for Kings;
 , Poitiers (1581) & Paris (1588)
 , Paris (1589)

From DNB

After following the study of mathematics, philosophy, and oriental languages, he passed two years at Toulouse, reading civil law. On his return to Paris, he began to employ himself in teaching philosophy. In 1574 he published at Paris a eulogistic memorial poem on Charles IX of France, entitled  (Juris Consultum), and in 1575, also at Paris, a work on the relation between religion and government, entitled {. A third book appeared in 1612. The work was dedicated to Queen Mary of Scotland, and, in keeping with his poem commemorating the author of the massacre of St. Bartholomew, was intended to demonstrate the necessity laid upon rulers to extirpate heresy as a phase of rebellion against a divinely constituted authority. The work was so highly esteemed by James Beaton, archbishop of Glasgow, that he recommended Queen Mary to bestow on him the office of counsellor or judge of the parliament of Poitiers, the province of Poitou having by letters patent from Henry III been assigned to her in payment of a dowry. Some misunderstanding regarding the nature of this office seems to have given rise to the statement of Mackenzie and others that Blackwood was professor of civil law at Poitiers.

At Poitiers he collected an extensive library, and, encouraged by the success of his previous work, he set himself to the hard and ambitious task of grappling with George Buchanan, whose views he denounced with great bitterness and severity in Apologia pro Regibus, adversus Georgii Buchanani Dialogum de Jure Regni apud Scotos, Pictavis, (1581) and Parisiis, (1588). During Queen Mary's captivity in England he paid her frequent visits, and was untiring in his efforts in her service.

After her death he published a long exposure of her treatment in imprisonment, interspersed with passionate denunciations of her enemies, especially John Knox and Elizabeth I of England. The book bears to have been printed "à Edimbourg chez Jean Nafield, 1587", but the name is fictitious, and it was in reality printed at Paris. It was reprinted at Antwerp in 1588, and again in 1589, and is also included in Samuel Jebb's collection, De Vita et Rebus gestis Mariae Scotorum Regime Autores sedecim, vol. ii., London, (1725).

At the end of the Martyre there is a collection of verses in Latin, French, and Italian, on Mary and Elizabeth. A fragment of a translation of the work into English, the manuscript of which belongs to the end of the sixteenth or beginning of the seventeenth century, was published by the Maitland Club in 1834. The work contains no contribution of importance towards the settlement of the vexed question regarding the character of the unhappy queen, but is of special interest as a graphic presentment of the sentiments and feelings which her pitiable fate aroused in her devoted adherents.

In 1606 Blackwood published a poem on the accession of James VI of Scotland to the English throne, entitled Inauguratio Jacobi Magnæ Britanitæ Regis, Paris, (1606). He was also the author of pious meditations in prose and verse, entitled , Aug. Pict. 1598 and 1608; of a penitential study, Aug. Pict. 1608; and of miscellaneous poems, Varii generis Poemata, Pictavis, 1609. He died in 1613, and was buried in the St. Porcharius church at Poictiers, where a marble monument was erected to his memory. By his marriage to Catherine Courtinier, daughter of the procureur de roi of Poitiers, he left four sons and seven daughters. His daughter Helen Blackwood married then lawyer in the Parlement of Paris and future skeptic philosopher François de la Mothe le Vayer in 1622. His collected works in Latin and French appeared at Paris in 1644, with a life and eulogistic notice by Gabriel Naudé. The volume contains an engraved portrait of the author by Picart, in his official robes.

References

1539 births
1613 deaths
People from Dunfermline
16th-century Scottish writers
16th-century male writers
17th-century Scottish writers
16th-century Scottish people
17th-century Scottish people
16th-century Roman Catholics
17th-century Roman Catholics
Scottish Roman Catholics
Scottish non-fiction writers
17th-century male writers